

References

Villages in Krishna district